Joseph J. Hindelang (born November 7, 1945) is a former American college baseball  coach and pitcher. Hindelang also played and coached basketball. He played college baseball and basketball at Temple University from 1965 to 1967 for baseball head coach Skip Wilson and basketball head coach Harry Litwack.  He then played professional baseball in 1967. He was the head baseball coach and assistant basketball coach at the University of the Sciences from 1978 to 1982, the same positions at Lafayette College from 1983 to 1990 and head baseball coach at Pennsylvania State University from 1991 to 2004. Hindelang also coached varsity baseball and basketball at Chestnut Hill Academy and the William Penn Charter School in Philadelphia.

Playing career
Upon graduation from Abraham Lincoln High School, Hindelang enrolled at Temple University to play basketball and baseball for the Owls.

Coaching career
Hindelang landed his first coaching job in baseball as the head coach at the Philadelphia College of Pharmacy and Sciences in 1978. He was the head coach for 5 years, leading the Devils to a record of 63–48–1. On September 6, 1990, Hindelang was named the head baseball coach at Penn State. On July 16, 2004, Hindelang announced his retirement from coaching.

Head coaching record

References

External links

1945 births
Living people
Temple Owls baseball players
Temple Owls men's basketball players
Oneonta Yankees players
Florida Instructional League Yankees players
USciences Devils baseball coaches
Lafayette Leopards baseball coaches
Penn State Nittany Lions baseball coaches
Baseball players from Philadelphia